Jason Dior Maxiell (born February 18, 1983) is an American former professional basketball player best known for his tenure with the Detroit Pistons from 2005 to 2013. He played college basketball for the University of Cincinnati and professionally in the NBA, China, and Turkey before retiring on August 4, 2017.

College career
After graduating from Newman Smith High School in 2001, Maxiell played college basketball for the University of Cincinnati from 2001 to 2005 where he was coached by Bob Huggins. After earning Conference USA Sixth Man and All-Freshmen team honors as a freshman, Maxiell earned All-Conference USA second team honors in both his junior and senior years. As a senior in 2004–05, he led Conference USA in blocked shots (2.8 bpg) and ranked 18th in the nation. His 91 blocks are the second-highest University of Cincinnati single-season total.

Maxiell finished 13th on Cincinnati’s career scoring list with 1,566 points (13th in Conference USA history) and second on the UC career chart for blocked shots with 252 (4th in C-USA). He also played 129 consecutive games, the second-longest streak in Bearcats’ history, and started the last 77 contests.

Professional career

NBA career

Maxiell was selected by the Detroit Pistons with the 26th overall pick in the 2005 NBA draft. On July 5, 2005, he signed his rookie scale contract with the Pistons. On October 31, 2008, he signed a four-year contract extension with the Pistons worth $20 million, keeping him under contract with the franchise until the end of the 2012–13 season. On June 29, 2012, he exercised his $5 million player option, returning to the Pistons for the 2012–13 season.

On July 18, 2013, Maxiell signed with the Orlando Magic to a reported two-year, $5 million contract. On July 4, 2014, he was waived by the Magic.

On September 28, 2014, Maxiell signed with the Charlotte Hornets.

Overseas career
On August 10, 2015, Maxiell signed with Tianjin Ronggang of the Chinese Basketball Association.

In June 2016, Maxiell was signed by Tropang TNT of the Philippine Basketball Association to be the team's import for the 2016 PBA Governors' Cup. However, on June 17, 2016, Maxiell was declared ineligible for the 2016 Governors' Cup after failing to make the height limit of 6 feet 5 inches. Maxiell was officially measured at 6'5 11/16" (6 feet 5.6875 inches).

On January 30, 2017, Maxiell signed with the second-tier Turkish team Acıbadem Üniversitesi.

Retirement
On August 4, 2017, Maxiell signed a contract with the Detroit Pistons, which allowed him to retire as a member of the Pistons.

NBA career statistics

Regular season 

|-
| style="text-align:left;" | 
| style="text-align:left;" | Detroit
| 26 || 0 || 6.1 || .426 || .000 || .333 || 1.1 || .1 || .2 || .2 || 2.3
|-
| style="text-align:left;" | 
| style="text-align:left;" | Detroit
| 67 || 8 || 14.1 || .500 || .000 || .526 || 2.8 || .2 || .4 || .9 || 5.0
|-
| style="text-align:left;" | 
| style="text-align:left;" | Detroit
| 82 || 7 || 21.6 || .538 || .000 || .633 || 5.3 || .6 || .3 || 1.1 || 7.9
|-
| style="text-align:left;" | 
| style="text-align:left;" | Detroit
| 78 || 4 || 18.1 || .575 || .000 || .532 || 4.2 || .3 || .3 || .8 || 5.8
|-
| style="text-align:left;" | 
| style="text-align:left;" | Detroit
| 76 || 29 || 20.4 || .511 || .000 || .574 || 5.3 || .5 || .5 || .5 || 6.8
|-
| style="text-align:left;" | 
| style="text-align:left;" | Detroit
| 57 || 14 || 16.3 || .492 || .000 || .515 || 3.0 || .3 || .4 || .4 || 4.2
|-
| style="text-align:left;" | 
| style="text-align:left;" | Detroit
| 65 || 42 || 22.6 || .478 || .000 || .547 || 5.1 || .6 || .5 || .8 || 6.5
|-
| style="text-align:left;" | 
| style="text-align:left;" | Detroit
| 72 || 71 || 24.8 || .446 || .000 || .621 || 5.7 || .8 || .4 || 1.3 || 6.9
|-
| style="text-align:left;" | 
| style="text-align:left;" | Orlando
| 34 || 13 || 14.4 || .448 || .000 || .484 || 2.5 || .3 || .2 || .6 || 3.2
|-
| style="text-align:left;" | 
| style="text-align:left;" | Charlotte
| 61 || 0 || 14.4 || .422 || .000 || .577 || 3.3 || .3 || .3 || .7 || 3.3
|- class="sortbottom"
| style="text-align:center;" colspan="2"| Career
| 618 || 188 || 18.4 || .495 || .000 || .564 || 4.2 || .4 || .4 || .8 || 5.6

Playoffs 

|-
| align="left" | 2007
| align="left" | Detroit
| 14 || 0 || 10.4 || .667 || .000 || .522 || 2.4 || .1 || .3 || .6 || 4.0
|-
| align="left" | 2008
| align="left" | Detroit
| 17 || 6 || 21.8 || .625 || .000 || .469 || 4.0 || .9 || .9 || 1.3 || 5.6
|-
| align="left" | 2009
| align="left" | Detroit
| 4 || 0 || 16.0 || .500 || .000 || .556 || 3.3 || .5 || .3 || .3 || 3.8
|- class="sortbottom"
| style="text-align:center;" colspan="2"| Career
| 35 || 6 || 16.6 || .626 || .000 || .500 || 3.3 || .6 || .6 || .9 || 4.7

Career highs
 Minutes: 44 vs. Golden State Warriors, November 14, 2007
 Points: 28 vs. Washington Wizards, April 11, 2008
 Rebounds: 16 vs. Houston Rockets, March 7, 2010
 Blocks: 7 vs. Washington Wizards, February 5, 2015

References

External links

1983 births
Living people
African-American basketball players
American expatriate basketball people in China
American expatriate basketball people in Turkey
American men's basketball players
Basketball players from Texas
Big3 players
Centers (basketball)
Charlotte Hornets players
Cincinnati Bearcats men's basketball players
Detroit Pistons draft picks
Detroit Pistons players
Orlando Magic players
People from Carrollton, Texas
Power forwards (basketball)
Sportspeople from the Dallas–Fort Worth metroplex
Tianjin Pioneers players
Basketball players from Chicago
21st-century African-American sportspeople
20th-century African-American people
American men's 3x3 basketball players